William Dunn Macray (1826–1916) was an English librarian, cleric and historian.

Macray was ordained and graduated MA. He was a Fellow of Magdalen College, Oxford, and worked at the Bodleian Library from 1845 to 1905. He received the degree Doctor of Letters (D.Litt.) honoris causa from the University of Oxford in June 1902.

He is best known for his Annals of the Bodleian Library (1868), an institutional history of the library; a second edition was published in 1890.

Notes

External links
 
 
 
 
 Works by William Dunn Macray at The Online Books Page

1826 births
1916 deaths
English librarians
19th-century English historians
19th-century English Anglican priests